Leslie Ernest Bradley (1 September 1907 – 20 July 1974) was an English actor. He died in Desert Hot Springs, California.

Filmography

 The Way of Youth (1934) as Lieut. Burton (film debut)
 Play Up the Band (1935) as Jack Heckdyke
 On Top of the World (1936) as Jimmy Priestley
 The Stoker (1937) as Frank Munro
 Holiday's End (1937) as Peter Hurst
 On Velvet (1938) as Monty
 Black Limelight (1939) as Bill - Young Detective on Duty
 Q Planes (1939) as Major Hammond's Assistant (uncredited)
 Atlantic Ferry (1941) as Horatio Stubbs
 Hi Gang! (1941) as Man
 The Young Mr. Pitt (1942) as Gentleman Jackson
 I'll Walk Beside You (1943) as Tom Booth
 The Dummy Talks (1943) (uncredited)
 Candlelight in Algeria (1944) as Henri de Lange
 Time Flies (1944) as Capt. Walter Raleigh
 Welcome, Mr. Washington (1944) as Captain Abbot
 Waterloo Road (1945) as Mike Duggan
 Flight from Folly (1945) as Bamber
 Anna Karenina (1948) as Korsunsky
 Just William's Luck (1948) as The Boss
 No Orchids for Miss Blandish (1948) as Ted Bailey
 Noose (1948) as Basher
 Prince of Foxes (1949) as Don Esteban (uncredited)
 There Is Another Sun (1951) as Track Manager
 A Case for PC 49 (1951) as Victor Palantine
 Quo Vadis (1951) as Hasta - 2nd Praetorian (uncredited)
 The Crimson Pirate (1952) as Baron José Gruda
 Slaves of Babylon (1953) as King Nebuchadnezzar
 The Dragon of Pendragon Castle (1953) as Mr. Ferber
 Man in the Attic (1953) as Constable #2
 Hell and High Water (1954) as Mr. Aylesworth (uncredited)
 The Iron Glove (1954) as Duke of Somerfield
 King Richard and the Crusaders (1954) as Castelaine Captain
 Seven Cities of Gold (1955) as Galves
 Kiss of Fire (1955) as Baron Vega
 Lady Godiva of Coventry (1955) as Count Eustace
 Good Morning, Miss Dove (1955) as Alonso Dove (uncredited)
 The Conqueror (1956) as Targutai
 Westward Ho the Wagons! (1956) as Spencer Armitage
 Naked Paradise (1957) as Zach Cotton
 Attack of the Crab Monsters (1957) as Dr. Karl Weigand
 Marjorie Morningstar (1958) as Blair (uncredited)
 Teenage Caveman (1958) as The Symbol Maker
 The Restless Gun (1958-1959, TV) as  Rev. Daniel Fletcher/Cedric Mayberry
 Frontier Gun (1958) as Rev. Jacob Hall
 The Buccaneer (1958) as Capt. McWilliams
 Johnny Rocco (1958) as Father Regan
 Alaska Passage (1959) as Gerard Mason
 The Sad Horse (1959) as Jonas
 The Twilight Zone (1959, TV) as Major Devereaux
 The Life and Legend of Wyatt Earp (1960, TV) as Clark (uncredited) 
 Wanted: Dead or Alive (1960, TV) as Marshal Thompson 
 Young Jesse James (1960) as Major Clark
 Perry Mason (1961, TV) as Dr. Walther Braun
 The Spiral Road (1962) as Krasser
 36 Hours (1965) as British Announcer (uncredited)
 Git! (1965) as Finney
 Assault on a Queen (1966) as Officer #3
 The Cat (1966) as Deputy Mike
 Sail to Glory (1967) as Sir Henry Bryon (final film)

References

External links

1907 births
1974 deaths
English male film actors
20th-century English male actors